Michael Yessis is a teacher, sports performance trainer, biomechanist, and author. He earned a Ph.D. from the University of Southern California. He has done work translating, adapting, and implementing sports training methodology from the former Soviet Union, including work by Yuri Verkhoshansky, Anatoliy Bondarchuk, and Vladimir Issurin, for over fifty years. Yessis has worked extensively with professional and amateur athletes, including Marv Marinovich, Evander Holyfield, Dianne DeNecochea, Jose Luiz Barbosa, and others in over 50 years of active work. Yessis worked with the Los Angeles Rams and Los Angeles Raiders professional football teams, as well as Team USA Volleyball. Muscle & Fitness Magazine referred to Yessis as a "legendary biomechanist."

Biography
In 1975 Yessis and Fred Wilt, noted athlete and running trainer, coined the term plyometrics while observing Soviet athletes warming up. In 1982 Yessis traveled to the Soviet Union to work with Yuri Verkhoshansky, a leading biomechanist and sports trainer from the USSR at a time of Soviet sports dominance.

Yessis's teaching career focused on a performance-based version of sports conditioning & training. As a biomechanist, he emphasizes technique analysis and movement pattern training in conjunction with strength building based on the specific physical requirements of each sport. Yessis has authored 16 books and over 2,000 articles in various publications, and has appeared often on television, radio, and the internet as an expert guest or commentator.  As a highly respected educator, Yessis was selected as a member of The Society for Unconventional Physical Education.

As a researcher and translator, Yessis made available for an English-speaking audience an array of significant Soviet books and journals created by the Soviet sports-scientists beginning in 1961, including Yuri Verkhoshansky, creator of  the 'shock method' of training, later to be called "plyometrics", Anatoliy Bondarchuk's signature work Transfer of Training and the signature work of Vladimir Issurin, Block Periodization Training.  Yessis was a leader of a group of athletes, sports coaches, and strength coaches to the Soviet Union to study at the Moscow State Institute of Physical Culture.  He established contacts for the exchange of information and for the development of greater exchanges between the countries. His work was responsible for making this body of Soviet science-based sports research available in the United States.  Yessis' translations include: Transfer of Training Volume I, Transfer of Training Volume II, Block Periodization Training, Special Strength Training A Practical Manual for Coaches, Running and Hurdling and numerous Soviet journals.

Yessis was chief editor for two well-established academic journals and senior editor for a Weider Publication.  Yessis was the editor-in-chief for The Fitness and Sports Review International, a quarterly publication from 1966–1994.  He also held the editor-in-chief position for Soviet Sports Review, a collection of translated journals from Soviet coaches and original articles from contributing writers from 1968–1972.  In addition, Yessis provided translation and original writing contributions to Soviet Sports Review.  Yessis served as senior editor for Sports Fitness (a Weider Publication known today at Men's Fitness).

Yessis served as training and technique consultant to the Los Angeles Rams & Los Angeles Raiders of the NFL, trained former All-American and Oakland Raider Marv Marinovich and his son Todd Marinovich, helping Todd to become a first-round draft choice. Yessis served as training and technique consultant to Evander Holyfield, professional beach volleyball player Dianne DeNecochea, and the U.S. Men's Olympic Volleyball Team. He has trained Olympians including Jose Luiz Barbosa, an 800m and 1500m runner, four time Olympian and gold, silver and bronze medalist in six world championships, Edgar Oliveira, an Olympian who participated in Barcelona and Atlanta in the 1500m, Joao N'tyamba who participated in three Olympic games in the 800m and 1500m, Wander Moura who holds the South American record in the 3000m Steeplechase, participated in the Olympics and World Championships and was victorious in the Pan American games in the late 1990s.

Richmond University head strength and conditioning coach Jay DeMayo is currently using Yessis' system. Yessis is currently training former NFL All-Pro Tim Green's son Troy Green (Skaneateles High School, New York) in preparation for college.  Yessis participates in seminars around the country and via webcast on a regular basis.

Yessis has written 16 books in the sports and fitness field including Explosive Running, Kinesiology of Exercise, Build A Better Athlete, and Sports: Is It All B.S.?  Yessis has authored more than 2,000 articles on fitness and sports training that have appeared in various publications: Running Times, Muscle & Fitness, Shape, Scholastic Coach, Fitness Management, National Strength and Conditioning Association Journal and Track and Field Coaches Review. His column was published in Muscle & Fitness magazine for 25 consecutive years.

Academics

Professional organizations 
American Running Association, 1979–present.
National Strength & Conditioning Association, 1980–1995.
LeTip Business Men's Group, 1985–1988.
National College Physical Education Assoc. for Men, Western Society, 1960–1985.
American Association for Health, Physical Education & Recreation, 1958–1982.
International Congress for Health, Physical Education & Recreation, 1976–1982.
American College of Sports Medicine, 1972–1982, 1990–1992.
International Biomechanics Society, 1975–1980.
California Association for Health, Physical Education & Recreation, 1958–1979.
National College Physical Education Association for Men, 1960–1978.
International Military Sports Council, 1968–1978.
International Council of Sports & Physical Education, 1968–1975.
Association Internationale des Ecoles Superieures d'Education Physique (AIESEP), 1968–1972.

Publications/books in English 
Explosive Tennis: The Forehand	Sports Training, Inc. (2000)	
Explosive Running (2000)
Explosive Golf: Using the Science of Kinesiology to Improve Your Swing (1998)
Inspiring Others To Win. Griffing Publishing, 1998. (Chapter contribution).
Sports and Fitness Success From 6 To 16 (1996)	
Body Shaping (1994).
Kinesiology of Exercise (1992)
Sports Restoration and Massage: Secrets Of The World's Greatest Superstars (1992)
Secrets of Soviet Sports Fitness and Training (1987)
Plyometric Training: Achieving Explosive Power in Sports (1986)
Running and Hurdling Fred Wilt, Editor, Dr. Yessis Translator Championship Books, 1984
Handball, 3rd Edition (1st Edition, 1966; 2nd Edition, 1972) William C. Brown, Publishers (1978)

References

External links 
cvasps.com
runrunlive.com
dryessis.com
running.competitor.com
People Magazine "Building the Perfect Player"

1932 births
Living people
American exercise and fitness writers
Cal State Fullerton Titans men's tennis coaches
University of Southern California alumni
American tennis coaches